Meadowtownella is a rare genus of odontopleurid trilobite found in Ordovician rocks. It is similar to Acidaspis cincinnatiensis but without the occipital spine.

Some species have been found in Gilwern Hill in Wales, but tend only to be found in the lower portions of the Kope Formation in Ohio. They are also found in Trenton Group
 rock units in New York State, Ontario and Quebec.

References

External links
 Image of Meadowtownella on Flickr

Odontopleuridae
Odontopleurida genera
Ordovician trilobites
Trilobites of Europe
Trilobites of North America
Paleozoic life of the Northwest Territories